An athletic trainer is a certified and licensed health care professional who practices in the field of sports medicine. Athletic training has been recognized by the American Medical Association (AMA) as an allied health care profession since 1990.

As defined by the Strategic Implementation Team of the National Athletic Trainers' Association (NATA) in August 2007:

"Athletic training encompasses the prevention, examination, diagnosis, treatment, and rehabilitation of emergent, acute or chronic injuries and medical conditions. Athletic training is recognized by the American Medical Association (AMA), Health Resources Services Administration (HRSA) and the Department of Health and Human Services (HHS) as an allied health care profession."

To become an athletic trainer one must have a master's degree from an accredited professional level education program and then sit for and pass the Board of Certification (BOC) examination. By 2023, all accredited professional programs will be required to provide a master's level education. Each state then has its own regulatory agencies that control the practice of athletic training in their state. Most states (42) require an athletic trainer to obtain a license in order to practice in that state, 5 states (Colorado, Hawaii, Minnesota, Oregon, West Virginia) require registration, 2 states (New York, South Carolina) require certification, while California has no state regulations on the practice of athletic training.
Areas of expertise of certified athletic trainers include:     
 Apply protective or injury-preventive devices such as tape, bandages, and braces
     Recognize and evaluate injuries
     Provide first aid or emergency care
     Develop and carry out rehabilitation programs for injured athletes
     Plan and implement comprehensive programs to prevent injury and illness among athletes
     Perform administrative tasks such as keeping records and writing reports on injuries and treatment programs

Services rendered by the athletic trainer take place in a wide variety of settings and venues, including actual athletic training facilities, primary schools, universities, inpatient and outpatient physical rehabilitation clinics, hospitals, physician offices, community centers, workplaces, and even the military. Emerging settings for athletic training include surgical fellowship opportunities.

Educational programs
The Commission on Accreditation of Athletic Training Education (CAATE) oversees the curriculum standards of all accredited Professional (entry level) and all of the institutions.  The standards dictate the content of both didactic and clinical practice portions of the educational program.  Content areas include:
 Risk Management and Injury Prevention
 Pathology of Injuries and Illnesses
 Orthopedic Clinical Examination and Assessment
 Medical Conditions and Disabilities
 Acute Care of Injuries and Illnesses
 Therapeutic Modalities
 Conditioning and Rehabilitative Exercises
 Psychosocial Intervention and Referral
 Nutritional Aspects of Injuries and Illnesses
 Healthcare Administration
 Professional Development and Responsibility
 Healthcare Professional Development and Responsibility

Post-professional programs
There are several post-professional masters-level athletic training programs. These programs are for credentialed athletic trainers who desire to become scholars, researchers, and advanced practice professionals. Schools with post-professional athletic training masters programs include:
A.T. Still University, University of Hawaii at Manoa, Illinois State University, Indiana State University, Indiana University, University of Kentucky, Michigan State University, Western Michigan University, University of North Carolina Chapel Hill, Ohio University, University of Oregon, California University of Pennsylvania, Thomas Jefferson University, Temple University, Old Dominion University, University of Toledo, University of Virginia, University of Missouri, Weber State University, University of Michigan, University of North Georgia and Winona State University.

There are doctoral programs in athletic training, each with different curricular emphasis. Athletic training program in doctoral education is offered by the University of Idaho, Florida International University, A.T. Still University, and Indiana State University.

Treatment population and settings
Athletic trainers treat a broad population, from the amateur and professional athlete to the typical patient in need of orthopaedic rehabilitative care. The NATA describes typical clients groups as,

 Recreational, amateur and professional athletes
 Individuals who have sustained musculoskeletal injuries
 Those seeking strength, conditioning, fitness and performance enhancement
 Others designated by the physician.

Services rendered by the athletic trainer take place in a wide variety of settings and venues.  These may include:

 Athletic training clinics
 Schools (K-12, colleges, universities)
 Outpatient Rehabilitation Clinics
 Hospitals
 Physician offices
 Community facilities
 Workplaces (commercial and government)
 Military installations and veteran medical facilities
 Professional sport organizations
 Performing arts

See also
National Athletic Trainers' Association
International Sports Sciences Association
Board of Certification, Inc.

References

 
^
Health care occupations
Sports occupations and roles
Sports medicine